Mae Suat is a village and tambon (sub-district) of Sop Moei District, in Mae Hong Son Province, Thailand. In 2005 it had a population of 7,827. The tambon contains 12 villages.

References

Tambon of Mae Hong Son province
Populated places in Mae Hong Son province